Thomas Hearns (born October 18, 1958) is an American former professional boxer who competed from 1977 to 2006. Nicknamed the "Motor City Cobra", and more famously "The Hitman", Hearns's tall, slender build and oversized arms and shoulders allowed him to move up over fifty pounds in his career and become the first boxer in history to win world titles in five weight divisions: welterweight, light middleweight, middleweight, super middleweight and light heavyweight.

Hearns was named Fighter of the Year by The Ring magazine and the Boxing Writers Association of America in 1980 and 1984; the latter following his knockout of Roberto Durán. Hearns was known as a devastating puncher throughout his career, even at cruiserweight, despite having climbed up five weight classes. He is ranked number 18 on The Ring'''s list of 100 greatest punchers of all time. He currently ranks #78 in BoxRec ranking of the greatest pound for pound boxers of all time. On June 10, 2012, Hearns was inducted into the International Boxing Hall of Fame.

Early life
Hearns was born in Grand Junction, Tennessee, on October 18, 1958, the youngest of three children in his mother's first marriage. With her second marriage, six children joined the first three. On her own, Mrs. Hearns raised Tommy and his siblings in Grand Junction until Tommy was five years old; then the family moved to Detroit, Michigan. Hearns had an amateur record of 155–8. In 1977, he won the National Amateur Athletic Union Light Welterweight Championship, defeating Bobby Joe Young of Steubenville, Ohio, in the finals. He also won the 1977 National Golden Gloves Light Welterweight Championship.

Professional career
Hearns began his professional boxing career in Detroit, Michigan, under the tutelage of Emanuel Steward in 1977. Steward had changed Hearns from a light hitting amateur boxer to one of the most devastating punchers in boxing history.

He won six major world titles in five weight classes during his pro career, defeating future boxing hall of famers such as José "Pipino" Cuevas, Wilfred Benítez, Virgil Hill and Roberto Durán. In addition, he won the IBO title at Cruiserweight.

Hearns started his career by knocking out his first 17 opponents. In 1980, Hearns carried his 28–0 record into a world title match against Mexico's Cuevas. Hearns ended Cuevas's 4-year reign by beating him by TKO in the second round. Hearns was voted "Fighter of the Year" by Ring Magazine in 1980.

Hearns vs. Leonard

In 1981, Hearns the WBA Champion, with a 32–0 record (30 KOs), fought WBC Champion Sugar Ray Leonard (30–1) to unify the World Welterweight Championship in a bout dubbed "The Showdown." In this fight, Hearns suffered his first professional defeat when Leonard stopped him in the 14th round. In the 13th round, Leonard, behind on points on all 3 judges scorecards, needed a knockout to win. He came on strong and put Hearns through the ropes at the end of the round. Hearns was dazed, totally out of gas and received a count but was saved by the bell. Leonard, with his left eye shut and time running out, resumed his attack in the 14th. Hearns started the round boxing and moving, but after staggering Hearns with an overhand right, Leonard pinned Hearns against the ropes. After another combination to the body and head, referee Davey Pearl stopped the fight. Hearns and Leonard banked a combined 17 million dollars for the fight, making it the largest purse in sports history at the time. The following year, Leonard retired due to a detached retina, and there would be no rematch until 1989.

Light Middleweight Champion

Hearns moved up in weight and won the WBC Super Welterweight (154 lb) title from boxing legend and three-time world champion Wilfred Benítez (44–1–1) in New Orleans in December 1982, and defended that title against European Champion Luigi Minchillo (42–1) (W 12), Roberto Durán (TKO 2), no.1 contender Fred Hutchings (29–1) (KO 3) and #1 contender Mark Medal (26–2) (TKO 8). During his reign at this weight, the 2 round destruction of Roberto Durán, in which he became the first boxer to KO Durán, is seen as his pinnacle achievement, earning him his second Ring Magazine "Fighter of the Year" award in 1984.

Hagler vs Hearns

While remaining super-welterweight (light-middleweight) champion, Hearns ventured into the middleweight division to challenge undisputed middleweight champion Marvin Hagler in 1985. Billed "The Fight" (later known as "The War"), this bout has often been labeled as the three greatest rounds in boxing history. The battle elevated both fighters to superstar status. Hearns was able to stun Hagler soon after the opening bell, but he subsequently broke his right hand in the first round. He did, however, manage to open a deep cut on Hagler's forehead that caused the ring doctor to consider a stoppage. The fight, however, was allowed to continue at this point, with the ringside commentators remarking on the fact that, "the last thing Hagler wants or needs is for this fight to be stopped on a cut." The battle did go back and forth some, but Hearns was unable to capitalize on his early successes against Hagler. As a result of breaking his right hand, Hearns began to use lateral movement and a good jab to keep Hagler at bay as best he could. This tactic worked fairly well, but in the third round Hagler staggered Hearns and managed to catch him against the ropes, where a crushing right hand by Hagler knocked Hearns down. Hearns beat the count but was clearly unable to continue and the referee decided to stop the fight. Despite the loss, Hearns garnered a tremendous amount of respect from fans and boxing aficionados alike. Considering the popularity of the fight and the level of competition, a rematch seemed to be a foregone conclusion and was highly anticipated, but it never took place.

Comeback

Hearns quickly made amends by dispatching undefeated rising star James "Black Gold" Shuler with a devastating first-round knockout in 1986. One week after the fight, Shuler was killed in a motorcycle accident. Hearns presented the NABF championship belt to Shuler's family at his funeral, saying he deserved to keep the belt as he had held it longer than Hearns.

In March 1987, Hearns scored six knockdowns of Dennis Andries to win the WBC light-heavyweight title with a tenth round stoppage at Cobo Hall, Detroit, Michigan. Later that year, his four-round destruction of Juan Roldán (63–2) to claim the vacant WBC middleweight title made Hearns a four-weight world champion.

In a huge upset, Hearns lost his WBC middleweight title to Iran Barkley via a third-round TKO in June 1988 in a bout Ring Magazine named 1988 Upset of the Year''. In November that year, Hearns returned to win another world title, defeating James Kinchen (44–3) via a majority decision to win the inaugural WBO super-middleweight title. Hearns became the first boxer to win a world title in five weight divisions.

Rematch with Leonard

Hearns had to wait until 1989 for a rematch with Sugar Ray Leonard, this time for Leonard's WBC super-middleweight title and Hearns's WBO title. This was Hearns's sixth Superfight, a fight which much of the public believed Hearns won, flooring Leonard in both the 3rd and 11th rounds. However, the judges scored the fight a controversial draw.

Later career

Hearns had one last great performance in 1991, as he challenged the undefeated WBA light-heavyweight champion Virgil Hill. In Hill's eleventh defense of the title, Hearns returned to his amateur roots and outboxed the champion to win a convincing decision and add a sixth world title to his illustrious career. On March 20, 1992, Hearns lost this title on a split decision to old foe Iran Barkley but continued to compete and won his next 8 bouts.

On June 23, 1997, Hearns appeared on a WWF telecast, performing in a storyline where he was taunted and challenged by professional wrestler Bret "Hitman" Hart, who claimed that Hearns stole the "Hitman" nickname. Hearns ended up attacking Jim Neidhart and knocking him down with a series of punches before officials entered the ring and broke up the confrontation.

On November 6, 1998, Hearns had a boxing fight which featured a rare, double knockdown. In it, Hearns and opponent Jay Snyder landed punches simultaneously during the very first round, Hearns a devastating right hand to Snyder's chin and Snyder a left jab to Hearns's chin. Hearns was able to get up before the referee's count reached ten seconds; Snyder was not and Hearns won by first-round knockout.

On 10 April 1999, Hearns travelled to England and beat Nate Miller by unanimous decision to win the IBO cruiserweight title. In his next fight in April 2000 he lost the title to Uriah Grant. The first round was competitive, with Hearns appearing hurt by a solid right to the jaw. Both fighters traded blows in the second round until Hearns appeared to injure his right ankle. He was forced to retire injured at the end of the round. The crowd booed and Hearns took the microphone and promised his fans that he would be back. Hearns fought twice more, winning both fights by TKO. His final fight was on 4 February 2006 against Shannon Landberg.

Personal life

Hearns's family is a fixture on the Detroit sports scene. His mother, Lois Hearns, is a fight promoter. Their company, Hearns Entertainment, has promoted many cards, including the Mike Tyson–Andrew Golota bout in 2000. His son Ronald Hearns is also a boxer, and he fought on the undercard of his father's last couple of fights. Hearns lives in Southfield, Michigan (a suburb of Detroit). Hearns serves as a Reserve Police Officer with the Detroit Police Department.

Due to personal financial issues, Hearns was forced to auction off his possessions at The Auction Block of Detroit, Michigan, on April 3, 2010. Items included were a 1957 Chevy, 47' Fountain boat, and a slew of collectible memorabilia. His debt to the IRS was $250,000. He took responsibility for repaying the entire debt, which he said was accrued from being overly generous toward his large extended family.

In 2012, Hearns was ticketed for parking in the middle of the road. He subsequently paid the ticket. His ticketing was featured in Parking Wars.

Professional boxing record

See also
List of boxing quintuple champions

References

External links

Thomas Hearns amateur boxing record
Thomas Hearns profile at Cyber Boxing Zone

1958 births
Living people
African-American boxers
Cruiserweight boxers
World Boxing Association champions
World Boxing Council champions
World Boxing Organization champions
International Boxing Organization champions
Winners of the United States Championship for amateur boxers
International Boxing Hall of Fame inductees
American male boxers
The Ring (magazine) champions
World welterweight boxing champions
World light-middleweight boxing champions
World middleweight boxing champions
World super-middleweight boxing champions
World light-heavyweight boxing champions
National Golden Gloves champions
Light-welterweight boxers
Boxers from Tennessee
Detroit Police Department officers
21st-century African-American people
20th-century African-American sportspeople